William Macfarlane (29 June 1889 – 15 August 1961) was a Scottish professional golfer.

Biography 
Macfarlane was born in Aberdeen, Scotland. Like many British golfers of his era, he took a position as a club professional in the United States. In 1925 he won the U.S. Open at Worcester Country Club in Worcester, Massachusetts. He tied Bobby Jones over 72 holes, with both men shooting 291. Macfarlane had set a new U.S. Open single round low-score of 67 in the second round. The two men played an 18-hole playoff and both of them shot 75. Macfarlane won a second 18-hole playoff by 72 shots to 73.

Macfarlane played in the U.S. Open 16 times, but only had one other top-10 finish. He won 21 times on the PGA Tour.

Death 
Macfarlane died in Miami, Florida.

PGA Tour wins (21)
1916 (1) Rockland CC Four-Ball
1921 (1) Philadelphia Open Championship
1924 (1) Westchester Open
1925 (2) U.S. Open, Shawnee Open
1928 (1) Shawnee Open
1930 (3) Metropolitan Open, Westchester Open, Mid-South Open Bestball (with Wiffy Cox)
1931 (2) Miami International Four-Ball (with Wiffy Cox), Kenwood Open
1932 (1) St. Petersburg Open
1933 (4) Metropolitan Open, Mid-South Pro-Pro (with Paul Runyan), Mid-South Open (tie with Paul Runyan and Joe Turnesa), Miami Biltmore Open (December)
1934 (1) Pennsylvania Open Championship
1935 (2) Florida West Coast Open, Glens Falls Open
1936 (2) Walter Olson Golf Tournament (tie with Tommy Armour), Nassau Open

Major championship is shown in bold.

Other wins
Note: This list is probably incomplete.
1922 Westchester Open

Major championships

Wins (1)

1 Defeated Jones in second 18-hole playoff – Macfarlane 75-72=147 (+5), Jones 75-73=148 (+6).

Result timeline

Note: Macfarlane never played in The Open Championship.

NYF = tournament not yet founded
NT = no tournament
WD = withdrew
CUT = missed the half-way cut
R32, R16, QF, SF = round in which player lost in PGA Championship match play
"T" indicates a tie for a place

Summary

Most consecutive cuts made – 10 (1923 PGA – 1931 PGA)
Longest streak of top-10s – 3 (1923 PGA – 1925 U.S. Open)

See also
List of golfers with most PGA Tour wins

References

Scottish male golfers
PGA Tour golfers
Winners of men's major golf championships
1889 births
1961 deaths